In 1979, the American National Standards Institute (ANSI) chartered the Accredited Standards Committee (ASC) X12 to develop uniform standards for interindustry electronic exchange of business transactions-electronic data interchange (EDI)

In 1986, the United Nations Economic Commission for Europe (UN/ECE) approved the acronym "UN/EDIFACT" which translates to United Nations Electronic Data Interchange for Administration, Commerce and Transport. UN/EDIFACT is an international EDI standard designed to meet the needs of both government and private industry.

The UN/EDIFACT Working Group (EWG), a permanent working group of the United Nations Centre for Trade Facilitation and Electronic Business (UN/CEFACT), develops and maintains UN/EDIFACT

X12 is used in the USA and by U.S. organizations worldwide. Much of the rest of the world uses the EDIFACT messages.

Mapping

See also
Electronic Data Interchange
EDIFACT
ASC X12

External links

 X12
 Complete list of all X12 transaction sets
 United Nations Centre for Trade Facilitation and Electronic Business
 Tradegate Australia

Electronic data interchange